Dr. Alcides Sagarra Carón (born August 18, 1936) is a Cuban sport official best known for moulding the amateur boxing team into a dominant force during his reign as the coach of the Cuban National Boxing Team (1964–2001,) for which he gained an honorary soubriquet "El Maestro".

Career
Carón was born in Santiago de Cuba.

From 1951-1954 he was an active boxer himself but quit due to his asthma. He worked as a mechanic but kept studying at the Sports Institute Manuel Fajardo.

In 1962 he became coach who quickly gained the reputation of being a strict disciplinarian, in 1963 he prepared the boxers of Havanna Province for the national championships. He sought the help of East German professor Kurt Rosentil to develop all kinds of innovative training methods.
He was so successful that as early as 1964 he was promoted to national head coach.
Also instrumental was Andrey Chervonenko, a Soviet coach sent to share training techniques as a display of Communism solidarity.
The first stars of the team were Enrique Regüeiferos (63,5 kilograms), Rolando Garbey (71 kg) and Roberto Caminero (60 kg) Cuba's first PanAm champ 1963.

Cuba medaled at the Olympics for the first time in 1968 (Regüeiferos, Garbey).
He helped to develop the skills of amateur superstars like three time Olympic gold medalists Teofilo Stevenson who upset Duane Bobick by KO in 1972 to start  heavyweight dominance and Félix Savón.

In 1992 the University of Havana awarded him a scientific title of "Doctor en Ciencias Pedagógicas". 2001 he retired from his post as national coach the post is now occupied by Sarbelio Fuentes.

His record is 32 Olympic Golds, 63 (senior) World championships, 64 junior/cadet World titles.

He also has a minor function in an AIBA commission.

Fighters trained

Cuban National Team boxers

Cuban boxers who later turned pro

Other Cuban boxers

References

External links
Article 
Hall of fame article

1936 births
Living people
Cuban boxing trainers
Cuban male boxers
Cuban sports coaches